The Rock Fort Campsite is a natural fortification on the south shore of the Columbia River in The Dalles, Oregon, United States. The Lewis and Clark Expedition camped at this defensible spot for three nights in late October 1805, just after it passed Celilo Falls on its descent to the Pacific Ocean, and again for one night on their return journey. It was here that the expedition first made significant contact and commerce with the Chinookan-speaking peoples of the lower Columbia.

See also
National Register of Historic Places listings in Wasco County, Oregon

References

External links

National Register of Historic Places in Wasco County, Oregon
Lewis and Clark Expedition
The Dalles, Oregon
Columbia River Gorge
Forts in Oregon
1805 establishments in Oregon